Biological Invasions is a peer-reviewed scientific journal on invasion biology published by Springer Science+Business Media.

Abstracting and indexing
The journal is abstracted and indexed in Scopus and the Science Citation Index Expanded. According to the Journal Citation Reports, the journal has a 2020 impact factor of 3.133.

References

External links

Ecology journals